The following is a list of Icelandic artists nominated for MTV Europe Music Awards. Winners are in bold text.

MTV Europe Music Awards